The Verzasca is a  long Swiss Alpine river originating at Pizzo Barone and flowing into Lake Maggiore. It is known for its clear turquoise water and vibrant colored rocks, as well as its treacherous currents. The Verzasca Dam is a few kilometers upriver from Lake Maggiore.

Geography
The Verzasca River valley (Valle Verzasca) is in Ticino, the Italian-speaking region of Switzerland. Chestnut trees thrive at the bottom of the valley. The river's water is crystal clear, and the depth does not exceed .

Recreation
The river is a popular scuba diving location and the valley is used for bungee jumping. The diving conditions are usually best from late spring to early autumn.

External links

References

Rivers of Switzerland
Rivers of Ticino